Ilimanaq, formerly Claushavn, is a settlement in Avannaata municipality in western Greenland. It had 53 inhabitants in 2020. The modern name of the village is Kalaallisut for "Place of Expectations".

Geography 

Ilimanaq is located on the eastern shore of Disko Bay, just south of the mouth of the Ilulissat Icefjord.

History 
The old Danish name of the settlement derived from the Dutch whaler Klaes Pieterz Torp. The whalers were active in the region from 1719 to 1732, leaving a trail of names behind  the settlement of Oqaatsut to the north was originally a Dutch whaling station named "Rodebay". Claushavn was founded in 1741, around the same time as Ilulissat.

Transport

Air 

Air Greenland serves the village as part of government contract, with winter-only helicopter flights between Ilimanaq Heliport and Ilulissat Airport. Settlement flights in the Disko Bay are unique in that they are operated only during winter and spring. During winter, the nearby Qasigiannguit town to the south of Ilimanaq can be reached on foot, or by dogsled.

Sea 
During summer and autumn, when the waters of Disko Bay are navigable, communication between settlements is by sea only, serviced by Diskoline. The ferry links Ilimanaq with Ilulissat, from where ferry connections are available to Oqaatsut, Qeqertaq, Saqqaq, Qeqertarsuaq, and towns and settlements in the Aasiaat Archipelago.

Population 
The population of Ilimanaq has been stable in the last two decades.

References

1741 establishments in Greenland
Villages of Ilulissat
Disko Bay
Populated places in Greenland
Populated places of Arctic Greenland
Populated places established in 1741
Avannaata